Horace H. "Hank" Herring (June 19, 1922 – May 18, 1999) was an American boxer. Herring was the Welterweight Silver Medalist at the 1948 London Olympic Games. Herring lost in the final to Július Torma of Czechoslovakia.

Early life and military service 
Herring was born in St. Petersburg, Florida. He joined the United States Navy, where he achieved the rank of steward chief petty officer. He was stationed at Naval Station San Diego, California and was one of the first U.S. Navy enlisted sailors to participate in the Olympic Games.

1948 Olympic tournament results
Below is the Olympic record of Hank Herring who competed as a welterweight boxer for the United States at the 1948 Olympic Games in London:

Round of 16: defeated Peter Foran (Ireland) on points
Quarterfinal: defeated Eladio Herrera (Argentina) on points
Semifinal: defeated Duggie DuPreez (South Africa) on points
Final: lost to Július Torma (Czechoslovakia) on points (was awarded the silver medal)

Pro career
Herring turned pro in 1949 and had little success.  After winning his first four bouts, he had little success from then on, retiring the following year having won 5, lost 7, and drawn 1.

Later life
He retired in the early 1970s. He died in Lemoore, California.

References

External links

1922 births
1999 deaths
American military Olympians
Boxers from Florida
Boxers at the 1948 Summer Olympics
Olympic boxers of the United States
Olympic silver medalists for the United States in boxing
Sportspeople from St. Petersburg, Florida
American male boxers
Medalists at the 1948 Summer Olympics
Welterweight boxers
United States Navy chiefs
20th-century American people